Basement is a 2010 British horror film, starring Danny Dyer and  written by Ewen Glass about six friends who are lured into a basement for a sinister experiment.

Plot

After returning from an anti-war demonstration, Gary (Danny Dyer), Sarah (Kierston Wareing), Saffron (Lois Winstone), Pru (Emily Beecham) and Derek (Jimi Mistry) stop in the country. Derek and Saffron discover a metal hatch in the middle of the forest and they decide to explore inside. Gary, Pru and Sarah search for their missing friends and follow them into the hatch and find themselves locked in when it closes behind them.

Production and release
Basement is the first feature film from Paperknife Productions; a company based at Pinewood studios. Terry Stone's Gateway Films is also involved in Basement'''s production. The film premiered at The May Fair on 17 August 2010 in London and was then released straight to DVD and Blu-ray on 23 August 2010.

Reception
Critical reception for The Basement'' has been negative, with BeyondHollywood.com writing that the film could have been "enjoyable trash, though sadly its mind numbing, soul destroying lack of energy or originality drags it back down into the mire." HorrorNews.net called the film "poorly written", saying that "in general it was just not a very good movie". Dread Central also reviewed the film, saying it was "an entertainment black hole. There isn’t a single line, performance, camera movement, idea, scene, shot or piece of editing that warrants any kind of praise or attention."

References

External links
 
 
 Official movie site

2010 films
British horror films
2010s English-language films
2010 horror films
2010s British films